Mon Laferte Vol.1 is the fourth studio album of the Chilean singer Mon Laferte, released on 21 August 2015.

Promotion

Singles 
The first single from the album was "Tormento", whose official video, launched on Vevo, was inspired by Serbian artist Marina Abramović. The second single was the ballad "Amor Completo", which Laferte wrote at a time when she was in love. The video was recorded in Mexico City and is made up of scenes showing a romantic day out with the actor playing Mon's love interest.
The third single, and her biggest hit up to that time, was "Tu Falta de Querer". Laferte wrote this song at a difficult time when she had just broken up with her boyfriend, which plunged her into a deep depression.
The fourth single is a song with a Mexican flavour, "Si Tu Me Quisieras". This song was included in the re-release of the Vol. 1 album when it was picked up by the label Universal Music Mexico.

Track listing

Personnel 
Credits adapted from Mon Laferte Vol.1 liner notes.

Vocals

 Mon Laferte – lead vocals

Musicians

 Manuel Soto – piano, synthesizer
Daniel Martinez – drums
David Rodríguez – saxophone
Santiago Lara – guitar
Jimmy Frazier – bass
Patricio Garcia Portius – electric guitar
Néstor Varela – trombone
Joe D'Ettiene – trumpet

Production

Mon Laferte – production
Benjamín Castro – mixing

Charts

Certifications 

|-
!scope="row"|Chile (IFPI)
|align="left"|4× Platinum
|40,000
|-

|-

Singles

References 

2015 albums
Mon Laferte albums